Graham John Dill (born 14 September 1970) is an English former first-class cricketer.

Dill was born at Luton in September 1970. He was educated at St Albans School, before going up to University College, Swansea. At the age of thirty he attended a postgraduate teacher training course at Homerton College, Cambridge. While studying at Cambridge, Dill played first-class cricket in 2001, making three appearances for Cambridge UCCE and one appearance for Cambridge University against Oxford University in The University Match. His four matches yielded him 27 runs and 5 wickets. Dill gained a blue in both cricket and golf and was the first person to gain a double-blue in both cricket and golf since Ted Dexter forty years previously. In 2002, he played minor counties cricket for Hertfordshire.

References

External links

1970 births
Living people
Alumni of Homerton College, Cambridge
Alumni of Swansea University
Cambridge MCCU cricketers
Cambridge University cricketers
English cricketers
Hertfordshire cricketers
People educated at St Albans School, Hertfordshire
Cricketers from Luton